David J. Gunnell  is an English epidemiologist and suicidologist who is Professor of Epidemiology at the University of Bristol. He was elected a fellow of the Academy of Medical Sciences in 2014 and received the American Foundation for Suicide Prevention's Research Award in 2015. He is also an ISI Highly Cited Researcher.

References

External links
Faculty page

British epidemiologists
Suicidologists
Fellows of the Academy of Medical Sciences (United Kingdom)
Fellows of the Faculty of Public Health
Living people
Academics of the University of Bristol
Alumni of the University of Bristol
Year of birth missing (living people)
NIHR Senior Investigators